The 2019 Tipperary Senior Hurling Championship was the 129th staging of the Tipperary Senior Hurling Championship since its establishment by the Tipperary County Board in 1887. The championship began on 6 April 2019 and ended on 3 November 2019.

Clonoulty-Rossmore were the defending champions, however, they were defeated by Kilruane MacDonaghs at the quarter-final stage.

On 3 November 2019, Borris-Ileigh won the championship after a 1-15 to 1-12 defeat of Kiladangan in the final at Semple Stadium. It was their 7th championship title overall and their first title since 1986.

Results

Group 1

Table

Group 1 results

Group 2

Table

Group 2 results

Group 3

Table

Group 3 results

Group 4

Table

Group 4 results

Knock-out stage

Relegation playoffs

Preliminary quarter-finals

Quarter-finals

Semi-finals

Final

Championship statistics

Top scorers

Top scorers overall

Top scorers in a single game

Miscellaneous
 Borris-Ileigh win their first title since 1986.

References

Tipperary
Tipperary Senior Hurling Championship
Tipperary Senior Hurling Championship